Corbeau was a popular 1970s Quebecois rock group. The group was formed in 1977 by the film-maker, lyricist and singer Pierre Harel, with Michel "Willie" Lamothe on bass guitar, Jean Millaire on guitar, Roger "Wézo" Belval on drums (all previously members of the group Offenbach) and Donald Hince on guitars.  Harel was the lead singer until the arrival of Marjolène Morin; the two shared the role until the departure of Harel just before the 1979 launch of their first album Corbeau. Corbeau broke up in 1984 after the departure of Marjo and Jean Millaire.

In 2009 the original members re-united to record one track for Marjo's new album, Marjo et ses hommes. Corbeau re-recorded the track Demain.

Members 
 Pierre Harel: vocals (1977-1979)
 Marjolène Morin: vocals 
 Donald Hince: guitar
 Jean Millaire: guitar, back up vocals
 Michel Lamothe: bass, back up vocals 
 Roger Belval: drums

Discography 
 1979: Corbeau 
 1981: Fou 
 1982: Illégal 
 1983: Visionnaire (Extended play) 
 1984: Dernier cri (Live album)
 1992: L'intégrale (Best of)

Corbeau 85 
 2005: Hôtel Univers
This incarnation included original members Pierre Harel, Michel Lamothe, Roger Belval & Donald Hinse

Corbach 
''This was another incarnation including members of the original Corbeau : Pierre Harel, Donald Hince, Michel Lamothe, Roger Belval
 1991 : Rite Rock
 1996 : Amérock du nord
 2002 : Félix en colère

Corbeau 85 - Corbach 
 2004 : Rockollection

Pierre Harel solo 

 1988 : Tendre ravageur
 2005 : Rock ma vie

Canadian rock music groups
Musical groups from Montreal
Musical groups established in 1977
Musical groups disestablished in 1984
Musical groups reestablished in 2009